Belarus participated at the 2010 Winter Olympics in Vancouver, British Columbia, Canada.

Medalists

Alpine skiing

Women

Biathlon

Evgeny Abramenko
Vladimir Miklashevski
Sergei Novikov
Michail Semenov
Alexander Syman
Rustam Valliulin
Lyudmila Ananko
Darya Domracheva
Lyudmila Kalinchik
Olga Kudryashova
Olga Nazarova
Nadezhda Skardino

Cross-country skiing

Men

Women

Freestyle skiing

Men

Women

Ice hockey

Men's tournament

Roster

Group play
Belarus played in Group C.
Round-robin
All times are local (UTC-8).

Standings

Final rounds
Qualification playoff

Speed skating

Women

See also
 Belarus at the Olympics
 Belarus at the 2010 Winter Paralympics

References

2010 in Belarusian sport
Nations at the 2010 Winter Olympics
2010